Konchi is a village in Singhpur block of Rae Bareli district, Uttar Pradesh, India. As of 2011, its population is 1,914, in 318 households.

The 1961 census recorded Konchi as comprising 6 hamlets, with a total population of 693 people (389 male and 304 female), in 156 households and 137 physical houses.
 The area of the village was given as 691 acres.

The 1981 census recorded Konchi as having a population of 917 people, in 175 households, and having an area of 280.04 hectares.

References

Villages in Raebareli district